Flatt may refer to:

Geography
Flatt (landform), a heathland pond, typical of North Germany

People
Johann Friedrich Flatt (1759–1821), German theologian and philosopher
John Ira Flatt (1834–1913), Canadian farmer, merchant and politician
Lester Flatt (1914–1979), American bluegrass musician, guitarist and mandolinist
Matthew Flatt, American computer scientist
Rachael Flatt (born 1992), American figure skater
Roy Flatt (1947–2011), English clergyman